Seraphsidae is a family of small to medium-sized sea snails, marine gastropod molluscs in the superfamily Stromboidea.

Genera
Genera within the family Seraphsidae include:
 Terebellum Röding, 1798
Synonyms
 Artopoia Gistel, 1848: synonym of Terebellum Bruguière, 1798 (invalid: unnecessary substitute name for Terebellum)
 Lucis Gistel, 1848: synonym of Terebellum Bruguière, 1798
 Terebrina Rafinesque, 1815: synonym of Terebellum Bruguière, 1798

References 

 Jung P. (1974). A revision of the family Seraphsidae (Gastropoda: Strombacea). Paleontographica Americana. 8(47): 72 pp., 16 pls.
 Bouchet P., Rocroi J.P., Hausdorf B., Kaim A., Kano Y., Nützel A., Parkhaev P., Schrödl M. & Strong E.E. (2017). Revised classification, nomenclator and typification of gastropod and monoplacophoran families. Malacologia. 61(1-2): 1-526.

External links
 National History Museum Rotterdam : Terebellum; accessed : 1 May 2011
 Gray, J. E. (1853). On the division of ctenobranchous gasteropodous Mollusca into larger groups and families. Annals and Magazine of Natural History. (2) 11: 124–132

 
Stromboidea